Gustaf Grefberg (born 18 February 1974) is a Swedish musician. As part of the demoscene, he is known under the artist name Lizardking, and much of his production is tracker music. He is or has been a member of the demo groups Alcatraz, The Silents, Razor 1911, The Black Lotus and Triton. He and Joakim Falk (a.k.a. dLx) invented a musical style called Doskpop and he released various music disks such as "Doskpop The Compilation" or "Memorial Songs 1+2" which feature many tracks in this style. He also took part in projects such as Merregnon and the Symphonic Game Music Concert-series in Leipzig, Germany.

In 1994, he released a compact cassette, Mindlitter, in cooperation with Martin Wall (a.k.a. Mantronix). His songs are on side A and Martin's on side B. They were in person selling the tapes at the Assembly '94 demo party.

He also has composed the score of several Starbreeze Studios video games, including Enclave, Payday 2 (several tracks),Justice, Knights of the Temple: Infernal Crusade, The Chronicles of Riddick: Escape from Butcher Bay, Magus Dawn, The Darkness and Brothers: A Tale of Two Sons.

Discography 
 Physiology (1993)
 Mindlitter (1994)
 Fashion8 (1998)
 Audiophonik (1999)
 Merregnon Vol.1 (2001)
 Merregnon Vol.2 (2004)
 Born in the Stars (as Xain) (2004)
 Amiga Hits! (2015)

References

External links 
Interview with Gustaf Grefberg on AMP
Interview with Gustaf Grefberg on Music 4 Games
MobyGames bio
Archive.org snapshot of Gustaf Grefberg's personal web site
Doskpop The Compilation (Music Disk for Commodore Amiga)
Memorial Songs (Music Disk for Commodore Amiga)
Memorial Songs 2 (Music Disk for Commodore Amiga)
Gustaf Grefberg SoundCloud Page

1974 births
Living people
Demosceners
Swedish male musicians
Video game composers
Tracker musicians